Ventnor is an historic home in the suburb of Randwick, a suburb of Sydney in New South Wales, Australia. It was built as the home of George Kiss, one of the earliest politicians in Sydney. It is listed on the local heritage register and is listed on the (now defunct) Register of the National Estate.

Description and history
George Kiss arrived in Sydney as a migrant who had been born in Warwickshire, England. He established successful businesses very quickly. Later he entered politics, becoming Mayor of Randwick, the oldest municipality in Sydney after the City of Sydney itself.

He called it Ventnor, most probably after the town Ventnor on the Isle of Wight, England. Situated on what is now Avoca Street, the house faced east to take advantage of the views to the ocean. In spite of its Georgian character, the house featured Victorian detailing in its cast-iron columns and various sash windows. The main entrance, situated on the east side of the house, featured a six-paneled door and a fanlight. On the west side of the house, facing Avoca Street, a single-storey wing was created.

Kiss died 13 August 1882. Two days later, the Sydney Morning Herald reported that Kiss had died in Ventnor on the previous Sunday. It described how he had made himself prominent in Sydney by his untiring energy and business capacity, laying the foundations of his businesses soon after arriving in the colony. He had gone on to become Mayor of Randwick and was still an alderman of Randwick at his death.

Ventnor was eventually acquired by the Our Lady of the Sacred Heart Church, situated just south of the house. It is used as a community centre by groups such as GROW.

Gallery

See also

 List of heritage houses in Sydney

References

New South Wales places listed on the defunct Register of the National Estate
Sandstone buildings in Australia
Historic houses
New South Wales Heritage Database
Houses completed in 1888
1888 establishments in Australia
Houses in Randwick, New South Wales
Old Colonial Georgian architecture in Australia